18th ADG Awards
February 8, 2014

Period Film:
The Great Gatsby

Fantasy Film:
Gravity

Contemporary Film:
Her
The 18th Art Directors Guild Awards, which were given on February 8, 2014, honored the best production designers of 2013.

Winners and nominees

Film
 Period Film:
 Catherine Martin – The Great Gatsby
 Judy Becker – American Hustle
 Jess Gonchor – Inside Llewyn Davis
 Michael Corenblith – Saving Mr. Banks
 Adam Stockhausen – 12 Years a Slave

 Fantasy Film:
 Andy Nicholson – Gravity
 Philip Ivey – Elysium
 Dan Hennah – The Hobbit: The Desolation of Smaug
 Darren Gilford – Oblivion
 Scott Chambliss – Star Trek Into Darkness

 Contemporary Film:
 K. K. Barrett – Her
 David Gropman – August: Osage County
 Santo Loquasto – Blue Jasmine
 Paul Kirby – Captain Phillips
 Bob Shaw – The Wolf of Wall Street

Television
 One-Hour Single Camera Television Series:
 Gemma Jackson – Game of Thrones (for "Valar Dohaeris")
 Bill Groom – Boardwalk Empire (for "The Old Ship of Zion")
 Mark Freeborn – Breaking Bad (for "Felina") 
 Donal Woods – Downton Abbey (for "Episode 7")
 Dan Bishop – Mad Men (for "The Better Half")

Episode of a Half Hour Single-Camera Television Series:
 Jim Gloster – Veep (for "Helsinki")
 Denise Pizzini – Arrested Development (for "The B. Team")
 Ray Yamagata – Californication (for "The Unforgiven")
 Richard Berg – Modern Family (for "The Wow Factor")
 Ian Phillips – Parks and Recreation (for "London")

 Multi-Camera Unscripted Series:
 Tyler Robinson – Portlandia (for "Missionaries")
 John Shaffner – The Big Bang Theory (for "The Bakersfield Expedition")
 Steve Olson – How I Met Your Mother (for "The Lighthouse")
 Keith Raywood, Eugene Lee, Akira Yoshimura, and N. Joseph DeTullio – Saturday Night Live (for "Host: Justin Timberlake")
 Anton Goss  and James Pearse Connelly – The Voice (for "The Live Playoffs, Part 1")

 Miniseries or Television Movie:
 Howard Cummings – Behind the Candelabra
 Mark Worthington – American Horror Story: Coven (for "Bitchcraft")
 Derek R. Hill – Bonnie & Clyde
 Gregory Melton – Mob City
 Patrizia von Brandenstein – Phil Spector

External links
 The winners and nominees on the official website

2013 film awards
2013 guild awards
Art Directors Guild Awards
2014 in American cinema